Afroptilum is a genus of mayflies belonging to the family Baetidae.

The species of this genus are found in Southern Africa.

Species:

Afroptilum biarcuatum 
Afroptilum bicorne 
Afroptilum boettgeri 
Afroptilum confusum 
Afroptilum dicentrum 
Afroptilum gilberti 
Afroptilum lepidum 
Afroptilum mathildae 
Afroptilum parvum 
Afroptilum sudafricanum

References

Baetidae